The 1970–71 season was the 47th season in the existence of AEK Athens F.C. and the 12th consecutive season in the top flight of Greek football. They competed in the Alpha Ethniki, the Greek Cup and the Inter-Cities Fairs Cup. The season began on 2 September 1970 and finished on 27 June 1971.

Overview

This season AEK Athens showed that were ready to claim titles and distinctions. Branko Stanković completed the renewall of the roster that he started from the previous season.

AEK began their competitive obligations with the Inter-Cities Fairs Cup, where the draw for the First Round brought them against the newly-formed Dutch Twente. Due to the unsuitability of AEK Stadium, the first match  took place at Karaiskakis Stadium. At the 7th minute, after a cross by Pahlplatz, Konstantinidis miscalculated the trajectory of the ball that passed past him and van de Kerkhof sent it into the net. Afterwards, the Dutchmen played to keep their goalpost intact. Eventually Twente left an important win in their hands, which gave them a big advantage for the 2nd leg. The rematch at Diekman Stadion emerged into a total disaster for AEK from its start to its end. At the 30th minute Konstantinidis was injured and AEK had to play for the rest of the game with the 36-year-old veteran, Serafidis. By the end of the first half, the Dutchmen secured the qualification within 6 minutes, with 2 goals by Pahlplatz and van de Kerkhof. Moreover, the start of the second half found Twente expanding their lead as Pahlplatz made the final 3–0 and AEK were eliminated from the competition without scoring a single goal.

In the Greek Cup, the club reached easily the semi-finals achieving victories with many goals against their opponents. In the semi-final they faced PAOK in Toumba Stadium and were eliminated with a dramatic 3–2 defeat.

Even though they were eliminated from the other competitions, AEK played spectacular football in general, while they also demonstrated a solid defensive performance as they concieded only 18 league goals. The matches that stood out this season from the league was a 8–2 win against Veria, which marks the highest scoring league victory in their history, while they also achieved another 6-goal win against Proodeftiki in a match that ended 6–0. As of the cup, AEK scattered the local amateur club, Kipoupoli by 20–0, on a Papaemmanouil's 7-goal performance and also trashed Agia Eleousa with a 10–0 win. The club remained undefeated for 12 games and after a brief fall in their performance in the middle of the season, finished the league with a total of only 3 defeats. Their great performance was rewarded with the conquest of the league, relatively early on in the season. Even though Panionios finished second with a distance of only 5 points from the top, AEK never faced any threats in claiming the title. Mimis Papaioannou adapted perfectly under his new role behind the strikers and scored league 27 goals, while Kostas Nikolaidis also had a great performance scoring 15 goals. As the season was approaching to its end, the club was beginning to struggle financially. The administrative disputes and the over the top for the time demands of the players, which appeared within the club, resulted in a series of issues. Those issues would mark the start of a declining period for AEK.

Players

Squad information

NOTE: The players are the ones that have been announced by the AEK Athens' press release. No edits should be made unless a player arrival or exit is announced. Updated 30 June 1971, 23:59 UTC+2.

Transfers

In

Out

Renewals

Overall transfer activity

Expenditure:  ₯0

Income:  ₯0

Net Total:  ₯0

Pre-season and friendlies

Alpha Ethniki

League table

Results summary

Results by Matchday

Fixtures

Greek Cup

Matches

Inter-Cities Fairs Cup

First round

Statistics

Squad statistics

! colspan="11" style="background:#FFDE00; text-align:center" | Goalkeepers
|-

! colspan="11" style="background:#FFDE00; color:black; text-align:center;"| Defenders
|-

! colspan="11" style="background:#FFDE00; color:black; text-align:center;"| Midfielders
|-

! colspan="11" style="background:#FFDE00; color:black; text-align:center;"| Forwards
|-

|}

Disciplinary record

|-
! colspan="17" style="background:#FFDE00; text-align:center" | Goalkeepers

|-
! colspan="17" style="background:#FFDE00; color:black; text-align:center;"| Defenders

|-
! colspan="17" style="background:#FFDE00; color:black; text-align:center;"| Midfielders

|-
! colspan="17" style="background:#FFDE00; color:black; text-align:center;"| Forwards

|}

References

External links
AEK Athens F.C. Official Website

AEK Athens F.C. seasons
AEK Athens
1970–71